"Say the Word" is Namie Amuro's 19th solo single under the Avex Trax label. It is her first single after the termination of her working relationship with longtime producer, Tetsuya Komuro. Debuting in the top three after an all-time low chart debut by its predecessor, "Think of Me / No More Tears" (2001), "Say the word" was her last single to sell over 100,000 copies until her 26th single, "All for You" (2004).

Release and promotion 
"Say the Word" was originally scheduled for release in July but was delayed a month for release on August 8. Early promotion for the single touted it as her first as a singer-songwriter. A vinyl single issued through Rhythm Republic was released in September. An exclusive remix of the title track, "Say the World (Clappy Mix)" was included on the a-side of the disc. 1,500 copies of it were released before it went out of print.

During year-end promotions where artist typically perform their most popular songs of the year in Japan, Amuro premiered a dance version of "Say the Word" on Best Artist 30. This version would later be released on the greatest hits album, Love Enhanced Single Collection (2002). The original version of the song has remained exclusive to its single and has not yet been released on an album.

Original version 
The original song was written in English by Ronald Malmberg and Thomas Johansson for Danish artist Jeanett Debb, the song was first released on her album Virtualize (2001) and later as a single to coincide with Amuro's version.

Commercial endorsements 
The song was licensed to Japanese cosmetic company Kose and appeared in a commercial starring Amuro herself. The version featured in the commercial is both musically and lyrically different from the version commercially released. The lyrics featured in the commercial are:

Say the word and I will be there for you
Aruite yukesou
Say the word and make my dreams come true

The English portions of the lyrics featured in the commercial match those written in Jeanett Debb's version, but were changed in the released version of the song.

In the commercial itself, Amuro advertises Kose's new line of waterproof lipstick, Luminus. It features her underwater and breaking through to grab hold of the cosmetic. She puts it on underwater to demonstrate the lipsticks ability stay on even under the most damp situations.

Music video 
A music video for "Say the Word" directed by Masashi Muto was filmed on location in Japan and revolves around three scenes. The video opens up with Amuro entering a bus. The song begins when she sits down and puts on headphones. The main scene of the video is a performance scene with Amuro dancing with four female dancers and two male dancers. The final scene of the video involved Amuro driving in a gold cadillac on an open road. Amuro once described herself as a paper driver on an episode of Music Station, meaning she had a license but didn't really drive. Behind-the-scenes footage of the video aired on Channel @, showed Amuro appearing nervous and yelling "Kowai" (Scary) during filming of the scene. The end of video has Amuro getting off the bus. As it comes to a stop the doors open to reveal nothing but water. Amuro has never explained the significance of the scene.

Track listing

CD single 
 "Say the Word" (Namie Amuro, Ronald Malmberg, Thomas Johansson) – 3:58
 "Let's Not Fight" (Rie Matsumoto, Ramona Lyons, Jay Lyons) – 4:14
 "Say the Word (Breeze House Mix)" (Remixed by Keiichi Ueno, Hiroshi Futami, Yuji Kudo) – 5:46
 "Say the Word (Instrumental)" (Ronald Malmberg, Thomas Johansson) – 6:41
 "Let's Not Fight (Instrumental)" (Ramona Lyons, Jay Lyons) – 4:14

Digital Download 
 "Say the Word" (Namie Amuro, Ronald Malmberg, Thomas Johansson) – 3:58
 "Let's Not Fight" (Rie Matsumoto, Ramona Lyons, Jay Lyons) – 4:14
 "Say the Word (Breeze House Mix)" (Remixed by Keiichi Ueno, Hiroshi Futami, Yuji Kudo) – 5:46

Vinyl single

Side A 
 "Say the Word (Breeze House Mix)" (Remixed by Keiichi Ueno, Hiroshi Futami, Yuji Kudo)
 "Say the Word (Clappy Mix)" (Remixed by Keiichi Ueno)

Side B 
 "Say the Word (Original Mix)" (Namie Amuro, Ronald Malmberg, Thomas Johansson)
 "Let's Not Fight" (Rie Matsumoto, Ramona Lyons, Jay Lyons)

Personnel 
 Namie Amuro – vocals, background vocals
 Hiroko Ishikawa – Dancer
 IYO-P – Dancer
 Shinnosuke Motoyama– Dancer
 Yumeko – Dancer

Production 
 Producers – Ronald Malmberg, Thomas Johansson
 Arrangement – Kazuhiro Hara, Keiichi Ueno, Cobra Endo
 Mixing – Eddie Delena
 Music Video Director – Masashi Muto

TV Performances 
 August 6, 2001 – Hey! Hey! Hey! Music Champ
 August 7, 2001 – AX Music Factory
 August 10, 2001 – Music Station
 August 25, 2001 – Pop Jam Summer Special
 August 30, 2001 – Utaban
 December 6, 2001 – FNS Music Festival
 December 19, 2001 – Best Artist 30
 December 24, 2001 – Hey! Hey! Hey! Music Champ X'mas Special Live V
 December 28, 2001 – Music Station Special Super Love 2001
 December 31, 2001 – 52nd Kōhaku Uta Gassen
 January 1, 2002 – A happy music year
 May 25, 2002 – MTV Video Awards Japan 2002
 July 28, 2002 – Music Fest Peace of RyuKyu
 September 29, 2002 – Asia 2002 Music Festival
 December 21, 2002 – MTV cool X'mas
 January 1, 2003 – CDTV Special Live 2002–2003
 February 8, 2003 – Pop Jam Special

Charts 
Oricon Sales Chart (Japan)

2001 songs
2001 singles
Namie Amuro songs
Avex Trax singles